The Golden River City Jazz Band is a New Orleans jazz band founded in 1970 in Kortrijk, Belgium, by clarinettist Jean-Jacques Pieters. The band is most noted for performances at the annual Kortrijk Golden River City Jazz Festival.

Members 
 Jean-Jacques Pieters – clarinet, saxophone 
 Terry Brunt – trombone
 Alan Eldson – trumpet
 Arsene De Vlieger – banjo
 Jean-Paul Mahieu – bass
 Colin Bowden – drums

Discography 
 Golden River City Jazz Band + George Probert + Jim Driscoll
 Festival
 The Lantern (Parsifal)
 The Artist (Parsifal)
 Memories (Parsifal)
 20th Anniversary Album (Moss)
 30 Years Golden River City Jazz Festival Kortrijk (Golden River)
 Lange Munte Blues (Hill Recordings)
 25 years Golden River City Jazz Band (Golden River)
 GRC Live Party (Golden River)
 GRC & Oscar Klein (Golden River)
 Hold That Tiger (Golden River)
 Tribute to Alan Elsdon (Golden River)

References

External links 
 lordisco.com
 
 
 
 Jazzton club

Belgian jazz ensembles